The Silence of Neto is a 1994 Guatemalan drama film directed by Luis Argueta. The film was selected as the Guatemalan entry for the Best Foreign Language Film at the 67th Academy Awards, but was not accepted as a nominee. It was the first time Guatemala had sent a film.

Cast
 Óscar Javier Almengor as Neto Yepes
 Herbert Meneses as Ernesto Yepes
 Julio Diaz as Eduardo Yepes

See also
 List of submissions to the 67th Academy Awards for Best Foreign Language Film
 List of Guatemalan submissions for the Academy Award for Best Foreign Language Film

References

External links
 

1994 films
1994 drama films
Guatemalan drama films
1990s Spanish-language films